Sowmeeh (also Romanized as Şowme‘eh and Şowma‘ah) is a village in Bala Velayat Rural District, in the Central District of Torbat-e Heydarieh County, Razavi Khorasan Province, Iran. At the 2006 census, its population was 1,694, in 459 families.

References 

Populated places in Torbat-e Heydarieh County